Warsaw Cathedral can refer to:
 St. John's Cathedral, Warsaw
 Field Cathedral of the Polish Army

Former:
 Alexander Nevsky Cathedral, Warsaw